The first cycle of Mongolia's Next Top Model ( abbreviated as "MNTM") is a reality television show based on the American franchise America's Next Top Model in which a number of aspiring models compete for the title of Mongolia's Next Top Model and a chance to start their career in the modeling industry in Mongolia and internationally. The Show is featured and produced on Edutainment TV, co-produced by Sodgerel Ulziikhutag. Host and judges are former model Nora Dagva, actor Orgil Makhaan and Nansalmaa Tumur.

The prizes for this cycle were: a 2-year modeling contract with Looque Models Agency in Singapore, a 1-year contract with G Mobile, a cash prize of ₮20.000.000 (about US$7,600), and a trip to Paris.

The winner is 20-year-old Tserendolgor Battsengel from Ulaanbaatar.

Contestants
(ages stated are at start of contest)

Episode summaries

Preliminary selections were made prior to the televised episodes to provide the initial 22 contestants.

Episode 1

Original Airdate: January 15, 2017

22 contestants were judged based on a 1960s style photoshoot at a mall. After that, the models walk in a runway stage. At the judging panel, the host welcomed a judge from Britain's Next Top Model. After the runway, Anu Otgonbayar cried because her shoe heels came loose and in this situation she lost her confidence.  However, she was one of those selected for the next round. The host chose the final 14 contestants and in a surprise twist, two contestants (Oyuunbileg & Jagzmaa) were added, increasing the number from 14 to 16.
 Wildcard contestants: Oyuunbileg & Jagzmaa

Episode 2
Original Airdate: January 19, 2017

The 16 contestants had a photo shoot in which they were dressed as Japanese geishas, and the photos were used to select for the next round. The photograph of Tserendolgor received the highest score. Photographs of Büjinlkham, Ikhertsetseg, and Tümenjargal received the lowest scores. As a result, Ikhertsetseg and then Tümenjargal were eliminated.

Challenge winner: Ankhbayar Munkh-Erdene
First call-out: Tserendolgor Battsengel
Bottom three: D. Büjinlkham, Ikhertsetseg Ganbold & B. Tümenjargal
Eliminated: Ikhertsetseg Ganbold & B. Tümenjargal
Special judge: Yavuutsagaan Byambajav

Featured photographer: Amgalan Otgonbayar

Episode 3
Original Airdate: January 22, 2017

The girls have their makeovers. Later, the 14 contestants have a photoshoot for Hada Labo skin care campaign. Binderiyaa fainted at the judging panel when Bat-Oyuun was criticized of her photoshoot. Büjinlkham and Jagzmaa landed in bottom two. And it was Bujinlkham was eliminated and placed 14th. After the elimination, Ankhbayar was given a birthday surprise where she is so happy about the celebration. She was also greeted by the judges a birthday song before her photo was criticized.
Challenge winner: B. Bat-Oyuun
First call-out: Nomin-Erdene Tuwshinjargal
Bottom two: D. Büjinlkham & Jagzmaa Bayarjargal
Eliminated: D. Büjinlkham
Special judges: Ulambayar Davaa (singer from Kiwi)

Featured photographer: Amgalan Otgonbayar

Episode 4
Original Airdate: January 26, 2017

At the beginning of the episode flashbacked the fainting moment of Binderiyaa. At the photoshoot, the contestants had a photoshoot of a dairy product wearing Deel (a Mongolian traditional wear). At the panel, Binderiyaa, Dashbaljid, Jagzmaa and Mandkhai landed in bottom-four revealing Mandkhai first to be safe from going home. Afterwards, It was also revealed that Jagzmaa was safe from elimination leaving Dashbaljid and Binderiyaa eliminated.

Challenge winner: Baljidmaa Yundenbat
First call-out: Baljidmaa Yundenbat
Bottom three: M. Binderiyaa, Dashbaljid Monhzul, Jagzmaa Bayarjargal  
Eliminated: M. Binderiyaa & Dashbaljid Monhzul
Special judges: Sodgerel Ulziikhutag

Featured photographer: Amgalan Otgonbayar

Episode 5
Original Airdate: January 29, 2017

Challenge winner: B. Anu-Üjin
First call-out: B. Anu-Üjin	
Bottom two: Ankhbayar Munkh-Erdene & Ijiltsetseg Ganbold
Originally eliminated: Ijiltsetseg Ganbold
Special judges: Ankhbayar O

Featured photographer: Amgalan Otgonbayar

Episode 6

Original Airdate: February 4, 2017

Special judges: Galbadral Nergui

Featured photographer: Amgalan Otgonbayar

Episode 7

Original Airdate: February 5, 2017

Special judges: Enkhbold Enkhtuya

Featured photographer: Amgalan Otgonbayar

Episode 8

Original Airdate: February 11, 2017

Special judges: Tsolmandakh Munkh

Featured photographer: Amgalan Otgonbayar

Episode 9

Original Airdate: February 12, 2017

Special judges: Badamgerel Khurelbaatar

Featured photographer: Amgalan Otgonbayar

Episode 10

Original Airdate: February 18, 2017

Special judges: Nyamkhand & Misheel Choigaalaa

Featured photographer: Amgalan Otgonbayar

Episode 11

Original Airdate: February 19, 2017

Special judges: Purevsuren Dorj

Featured photographer: Amgalan Otgonbayar

Episode 12

Original Airdate: February 25, 2017

Special judges: Nomungerel B

 Featured photographer: Amgalan Otgonbayar

Episode 13

Original Airdate: February 26, 2017

The final 5 girls were have another makeovers.

Special judges: Fadli Rahman

 Featured photographer: Fadli Rahman

Episode 14

Original Airdate: March 4, 2017

Special judges: Bolormaa D

 Featured photographer: Fadli Rahman

Episode 15
Original Airdate: March 5, 2017

Nora invited all the girls back for a dinner whilst catching up on everything that happened.

Episode 16
Original Airdate: March 11, 2017

This episode recapped the entire competition from the first episode up to the selection of the final three contestants.

Episode 17

Original Airdate: March 12, 2017

Call-out order

 The contestant was eliminated
 The contestant was originally eliminated from the competition but was saved 
 The contestant was part of a non-elimination bottom two.
 The contestant won the competition

Scoring chart

 Indicates the contestant won the competition.
 Indicates the contestant had the highest score that week.
 Indicates the contestant was eliminated that week.
 Indicates the contestant was in the bottom two that week.
 Indicates the contestant was originally eliminated that week, but was saved.

Photo shoot guide
Episode 2 photo shoot: Two Sided Of High Fashionable Create With The Shadow
Episode 3 photo shoot: Science Master
Episode 4 photo and commercial: Wet And Wild Body Athletic On The Wall
Episode 5 photo shoot and commercial: Head To Head Personality Commercial On a Team
Episode 6 photo shoot: Sweet And Dreamy In Candyland With Coated Of Candy's
Episode 7 photo shoot: House Fighting
Episode 8 photo shoot: Create The Arts In Avant Garde Style And Background
Episode 9 photo shoot: The Supermodel's Aura
Episode 10 photo shoot And Commercial: Glam And Glamour In Iguazu WaterFalls,Canon Camera Television Commercial
Episode 11 photo shoot: Haute Couture Catalogue Compcard
Episode 12 photo shoot: Local Amazonians With Jaguar And Traditional Clothes
Episode 13 photo shoot: Zero Waste At Garbage In Photo And Video
Episode 14 photo shoot And Commercial: Exotic Baby's,Loreal Cover And Commercial,Six Continental And Four Seasons Runaway
Episode 15 photo shoot And Acting Video : Inca's Kingdom Photoshoot And War Acting Commercial,1900's Latin Photo Group
Episode 16 photo shoot: Four Magazine Cover

References

Mongolian-language television shows
Mongolia's Next Top Model